Macarophaeus is a genus of European ground spiders that was first described by J. Wunderlich in 2011.  it contains only three species: M. cultior, M. insignis, and M. varius.

References

Araneomorphae genera
Gnaphosidae